Novospassk is a rural locality (a selo) in Mukhorshibirsky District, Republic of Buryatia, Russia. The population was 57 as of 2010. There is 1 street.

Geography 
Novospassk is located 50 km northeast of Mukhorshibir (the district's administrative centre) by road. Tugnuy is the nearest rural locality.

References 

Rural localities in Mukhorshibirsky District